Willy 'Awillo' Stephanus (born 26 June 1991) is a Namibian international footballer who recently used  to play for Lusaka Dynamos in the Zambia Super League, having moved as a free agent from AC Kajaani in Finland.

International career

International goals
Scores and results list Namibia's goal tally first.

Honours 
Black Africa S.C.
Winner
 Namibia Premier League (4): 2010–11, 2011–12, 2012–13, 2013–14

Runner-up
 Namibia Premier League: 2014–15

References

1991 births
Living people
Namibian men's footballers
Namibian expatriate footballers
Namibian expatriate sportspeople in Thailand
Expatriate footballers in Thailand
Namibian expatriate sportspeople in South Africa
Expatriate soccer players in South Africa
Black Africa S.C. players
Bloemfontein Celtic F.C. players
Willy Stephanus
Willy Stephanus
Namibia international footballers
2019 Africa Cup of Nations players
Association football midfielders
Expatriate footballers in Zambia
Lusaka Dynamos F.C. players
AC Kajaani players
People from Hardap Region